Xanthe Eleanora Marie Davina Elbrick (born 1 December 1978 in London) is an English Tony Award-nominated stage actress. The youngest of four children, Xanthe (pronounced 'ZANTHEE') was born in London, England, and attended Benenden School.

She was trained at RADA (London) and at the Actors Studio (New York City). She graduated with a Masters in philosophy from the University of Edinburgh in 2000, where she was director of the Edinburgh Footlights Theatre Company. 

In 2007, she appeared as Young Alexander Ashbrook and Aaron in the Broadway production of Helen Edmundson's Coram Boy.

She has given voice to a character of Sith Inquisitor class in Star Wars: The Old Republic video game.

References

External links

1978 births

Living people
Alumni of the University of Edinburgh
British expatriate actresses in the United States
Actresses from London
Audiobook narrators
People educated at Benenden School
English stage actresses
English television actresses
English voice actresses
21st-century English actresses
Theatre World Award winners